The 2003 European Team Gymnastics Championships was the second edition of the European Team Gymnastics Championships. The competition formed teams of athletes representing different nations, combining events from men's and women's artistic gymnastics, as well as rhythmic gymnastics. The event was held from May 3 to May 4 in Moscow, Russia. The competition was organized by the European Union of Gymnastics.

Medalists

See also
 1997 European Gymnastics Masters
 1999 European Gymnastics Masters
 2001 European Team Gymnastics Championships
 European Gymnastics Championships

References

European Team Gymnastics Championships
2003 in gymnastics
International gymnastics competitions hosted by Russia
2003 in Russian sport
May 2003 sports events in Russia